The Bern Historical Museum is the second largest historical museum in Switzerland. It was designed by the Neuchâtel architect André Lambert and built in 1894. Since it was initially conceived as the Swiss National Museum (which the city of Zurich was later chosen to host), the architect took as his model various historic castles from the 15th and 16th centuries. An extension to the original museum building was completed in 2009.

The museum contains collections related to the history of Bern from prehistoric times to the present and other artefacts on permanent display from Asia, Oceania, America and Egypt. One of the most remarkable items in the collection is the Muri statuette group, a group of six Gallo-Roman bronze figurines. 

The Bern Historical Museum is a heritage site of national significance.

Over the museum's entrance is a glass mosaic, "The Age of History", featuring the figures of Poetry and History, made in 1900 by the Swiss painter Léo-Paul Robert.

Einstein Museum

First conceived as a temporary exhibition in 2005, the Einstein Museum became a museum dedicated to the life and work of Albert Einstein, who developed the Relativity Theory while living in Bern. The house where he lived (Einsteinhaus) in this period is also open to the public, but is located elsewhere in the city and charges separate entry fees.

Footnotes

External links

Historical Museum of Bern
The Einstein house

History museums in Switzerland
Museums in Bern
Cultural property of national significance in the canton of Bern